The Bride from Hell is a 1972 Hong Kong horror film directed by Chou Hsu-Chiang and produced by the Shaw Brothers studio.

Plot
Yunpeng (Yang Fan) and his servant stay at a country inn one dark evening to escape potential robbers and ghosts. But Yunpeng chances into something far more dangerous when he accidentally happens upon the comely Anu (Xing Hui) naked in bed. To atone for his rudeness, he has to marry her. Because of her beauty, the request is not too difficult to fulfill...until she is introduced to his aunts and uncles, who notice her ghastly green glow and deduce that she's a spirit from the netherworld. But there's something even darker about her appearance, and it may be revenge on his in-laws.

Cast 
 Margaret Hsing - Anu / Feng Ai Jiao
 Yang Fang - Nie Yun Peng
 Lui Ming - Master Jin Lu Shan
 Carrie Ku Mei	- Jing Gu
 Ko Hsiao-Pao - Da Huo Zi (Peng's servant)
 Chang Feng - Master Tai Yi

References

1972 films
Shaw Brothers Studio films
1972 horror films
1970s Mandarin-language films
Hong Kong horror films
1970s Hong Kong films